The men's 400 metres event at the 1959 Pan American Games was held at the Soldier Field in Chicago on 31 August and 1 September.

Medalists

Results

Heats
Held on 31 August

Semifinals
Held on 31 August

Final
Held on 1 September

References

Athletics at the 1959 Pan American Games
1959